Christopher Dale Crooms (born February 4, 1969) is a former American professional football player who was a safety in the National Football League (NFL) and the World League of American Football (WLAF). He played for the Los Angeles Rams of the NFL, and the Barcelona Dragons of the WLAF. Crooms played collegiately at the Texas A&M University.

According to public criminal records in Harris County, TX, Christopher Crooms was charged with sexual assault of a minor (14-17) in Harris County, Texas, in June of 1999 (Cause  number 081447601010 - The State of Texas vs. CROOMS, CHRISTOPHER DALE).  The charges originated in Baytown, TX, (  BAYTOWN POLICE DEPAR OFFENSE NO: 99-23079). The case was later dismissed.

References
2. Harris County District Clerk. Retrieved February 20, 2023. 

1969 births
Living people
American football defensive backs
Barcelona Dragons players
Los Angeles Rams players
Players of American football from Houston
Texas A&M Aggies football players